A number of steamships have carried the name Fort Cumberland:

 – a Fort ship
 – a Type T2-SE-A1 tanker

Ship names